Here Comes Science is the fourth children's album and fourteenth studio album by American alternative rock band, They Might Be Giants,  packaged as a CD/DVD set. The album is (as the title suggests) science-themed, and is the third in their line of educational albums, following 2005's Here Come the ABCs and 2008's Here Come the 123s. It was nominated for the "Best Musical Album For Children" Grammy.

Background
The band began hinting that the next children's album would be science-themed via interviews around the release of 123s, but the actual title of the album was not confirmed until an August 2008 interview with John Flansburgh for Blogcritics Magazine. The album had been in production since at least late 2007, as a very short sample clip of the music video for the song "How Many Planets" was posted in January 2008 to Colourmovie's website. The band also hired a scientific consultant for this project because, as Flansburgh admitted, "frankly, I was a terrible science student in high school. My last memory of the periodic table was right before I lost consciousness."

Here Comes Science features the songs "I Am a Paleontologist" and "Speed and Velocity", on which bass guitarist Danny Weinkauf and drummer Marty Beller sing their own compositions (respectively). This idea has been a common theme for the band's children's albums, but has never been put in place on any of their adult-oriented albums. "I Am a Paleontologist" features spoken appearances from Weinkauf's two children, Lena and Kai.

"I Am a Paleontologist" was featured in a Payless ShoeSource commercial featuring kids inside a dinosaur museum.

As of 2013, the album has sold 32,000 copies in United States.

Track listing
The CD track listing is the same as the DVD track listing, with the exception of the bonus track "Waves", which is absent from the DVD.

Personnel
They Might Be Giants
John Linnell - vocals, keyboard
John Flansburgh - vocals, guitar
Marty Beller - drums
Danny Weinkauf - bass
Dan Miller - guitar
Additional musicians
Robin Goldwasser - additional vocals on "How Many Planets?", "Electric Car", "The Bloodmobile", "Photosynthesis"
Hannah & Niffer Levine - additional vocals on "Computer Assisted Design"
Lena & Kai Weinkauf - additional vocals on "I Am A Paleontologist"
Dan Levine - trombone, bass trombone, arrangement, alto horn, euphonium
Stan Harrison - tenor saxophone, baritone saxophone, flute
Curt Ramm - trumpet, flugelhorn, trumpet solo
Michael Leonhart - trumpet, flugelhorn, mellophone
Jonathan Levine - piccolo, alto flute, alto saxophone, bass clarinet

References

External links
 Here Comes Science at This Might Be A Wiki
 

2009 albums
They Might Be Giants albums
Children's music albums by American artists
Idlewild Recordings albums
Kindie rock albums
Disney Sound albums